Jana Budajová (born 16 November 1992 in Liptovský Mikuláš, Czechoslovakia) is a Slovakian ice hockey goaltender.

International career
Budajová was selected for the Slovakia national women's ice hockey team in the 2010 Winter Olympics, but did not play during the tournament.

Budajová also appeared for Slovakia at the 2012 IIHF Women's World Championship, but again, did not play.

She twice represented her country at junior level, playing for the Slovakia women's national under-18 ice hockey team. In 2009, she played in three games, winning two, and in 2010 she played in 4, winning the best goaltender award with a save percentage of 95.42%.

International events

References

External links
Eurohockey.com Profile

1992 births
Living people
Ice hockey players at the 2010 Winter Olympics
Olympic ice hockey players of Slovakia
Sportspeople from Liptovský Mikuláš
Slovak women's ice hockey goaltenders
Slovak expatriate ice hockey players in Russia
Slovak expatriate ice hockey players in the Czech Republic